Antonio Rossi (born December 19, 1968) is an Italian sprint canoer who has competed since the early 1990s. Competing in five Summer Olympics, he won five medals which included three golds (K-1 500 m: 1996, K-2 1000 m: 1996, 2000), one silver (K-2 1000 m: 2004), and one bronze (K-2 500 m: 1992). He also designs and produces a variety of clothing, such as high quality underwear.

Biography
Rossi was born in Lecco. As well as the Olympics, he has also been successful at the ICF Canoe Sprint World Championships with seven medals. This includes three golds (K-2 1000 m: 1995, 1997, 1998), three silvers (K-2 1000 m: 1993, 1994; K-4 200 m: 1998), and one bronze (K-1 500 m: 1997).

He was the Italian flag bearer at the opening ceremony of the 2008 Summer Olympics in Beijing. Rossi's wife, Lucia Micheli, competed in the K-4 500 m event at the 1992 Summer Olympics in Barcelona. His clus is G.S. Fiamme Gialle.

See also
 Italy at the Olympics - Athletes with most medals
 Italy at the Olympics - Men gold medalist
 List of flag bearers for Italy at the Olympics

References

External links
 
 
 
 Official website 
 RAI Profile 

1968 births
Canoeists at the 1992 Summer Olympics
Canoeists at the 1996 Summer Olympics
Canoeists at the 2000 Summer Olympics
Canoeists at the 2004 Summer Olympics
Canoeists at the 2008 Summer Olympics
Italian male canoeists
Living people
Olympic canoeists of Italy
Olympic gold medalists for Italy
Olympic silver medalists for Italy
Olympic bronze medalists for Italy
Sportspeople from Lecco
Olympic medalists in canoeing
Canoeists of Fiamme Gialle
ICF Canoe Sprint World Championships medalists in kayak
Medalists at the 2004 Summer Olympics
Medalists at the 2000 Summer Olympics
Medalists at the 1996 Summer Olympics
Medalists at the 1992 Summer Olympics